The 58 Division is a division of the Sri Lanka Army formed in 2008, prior to which it was known as Task Force 1 from 2007 to 2009. A principal offensive division, it is currently deployed for combat operations in the Wanni region. The Special Forces Brigade has been attached to the division.

Current formation
 58-1 Brigade
 58-2 Brigade
 58-3 Brigade

Sri Lankan Civil War

Operations
The Division recaptured the strategically important Pooneryn salient and played a major role in the recapture of the Kilinochchi in the Battle of Kilinochchi and the strategically important Elephant Pass the Gateway to Jaffna.

On 15 January, 58 Division gained total control over Dharmapuram, in Kilinochchi District, a key LTTE stronghold located along the A-35 Paranthan - Mullaittivu main road. Troops cleared the area of LTTE fighters.

On 28 January, troops from the 58th Division gained control of Vishwamadu town, located south-east of Dharmapuram on the A-35 main road.

On 29 March to 5 April 2009 Battle of Aanandapuram which was a land battle fought between the 58 Division, 53 Division and Task Force 8 and the Liberation Tigers of Tamil Eelam (LTTE) for the control of the last stronghold held by the LTTE.

Towns captured by 58 Division

References

Sri Lanka Army divisions
Military units and formations established in 2008
2008 establishments in Sri Lanka